Ferruccio Azzarini (8 November 1924 – 1 June 2005) was an Italian footballer.

References

1924 births
2005 deaths
Italian footballers
Serie A players
S.S.D. Varese Calcio players
Inter Milan players
Mantova 1911 players
Association football midfielders
Vigevano Calcio players